Haakon Magnusson may refer to:
Haakon Magnusson of Norway, son of Magnus II of Norway, recognized as king only in Trondheim
Haakon V of Norway, son of Magnus VI of Norway
Haakon VI of Norway, son of Magnus VII of Norway